The Canadian Letters and Images Project is an online archive of the collective war experience of Canada, from any war, as told through contemporary letters and images.  The project was started in August 2000 by the Department of History at Vancouver Island University.  In November 2003 the History Department at the University of Western Ontario joined the project.

The objective of the project is to create a permanent online archive of Canada's wartime correspondence, photographs, and other personal materials, from the battlefront and from the homefront.  The project does not edit correspondence or select portions of collections.  The materials submitted are scanned and returned to the submitter.

All incoming materials since July 1, 2003 have been scanned both to JPEG format for the web site and to high resolution Tagged Image File Format for future preservation.

External links
Canadian Letters and Images Project

Studies of Canadian history